Great Post Road (De Groote Postweg) is a 1996 Dutch film about the Great Post Road constructed in Java when it was part of the Dutch East Indies. The film is narrated by Indonesian author Pramoedya Ananta Toer.

References

1996 films
Dutch documentary films
Documentary films about road transport
Documentary films about Indonesia